John Wick is an American media franchise.

John Wick may also refer to:

 John Wick (film), 2014 action film and the first film in the franchise
 John Wick (character), the main protagonist of the John Wick film series portrayed by Keanu Reeves
 John Wick (soundtrack), the film's soundtrack
John Wick Hex, a game based on the film series
 John Wick (game designer), American RPG designer
 John Wick, former Special Air Service major who was a source in the United Kingdom parliamentary expenses scandal
 John F. Wick, organist and founder of the Wicks Organ Company

See also
 Jan Wyck (1652–1702), artist
 John Wicks (disambiguation)
 Wick (disambiguation)